Big Brother Brasil 19 is the nineteenth season of Big Brother Brasil which premiered on January 15, 2019 on the Rede Globo. The show is produced by Endemol Shine and presented by Tiago Leifert.

The grand prize is R$1.5 million with tax allowances, plus a R$150,000 prize offered to the runner-up and a R$50,000 prize offered to the housemate in third place.

On April 12, 2019, 28 year-old bachelor in law Paula von Sperling from Lagoa Santa, Minas Gerais won the competition with 61.09% of the public vote over administrator 
& entrepreneur Alan Possamai.

A worldwide record breaking number of 202.406.432 million votes were cast on week 10's eviction besides being the lowest-rated season ever to date.

The game

Super Nomination
In a twist called "Super Nomination", there was no Head of Household and Power of Immunity competitions, as well the housemates' vote to nominate during the first week. Instead, three housemates won immunity through two competitions (Danrley and Gustavo won the first on day 1, while Paula won the second on day 3) while the remaining fourteen were automatically nominated. Vinicius, as the housemate who received the fewest public votes to save was evicted on day 8.

Room of the Seven Challenges
On Day 6, the housemates were asked to go to the Diary Room and vote for who they wanted out of the game. The three housemates with the most votes would be moved to the "Room of the Seven Challenges". If they completed the challenges presented to them, they would be allowed to veto three housemates from competing in the first HoH competition. However, if they fail, they would be vetoed from the competition instead.

Fake Eviction
Week 7 was a fake eviction week. Unbeknownst to the housemates, Brazil was voting to give immunity for week 8's eviction to one of the nominees. Gabriela was voted to be immune. After walking through the eviction door, Gabriela was secretly taken to the house pantry to surprise her housemates.

Quadruple Nomination & House Eviction Vote
Week 8 was a "Quadruple Nomination" week where four housemates were nominated - one by the Head of Household, two from the House's nomination vote and one by the Big Phone. While there was no Power of Immunity, three housemates were awarded immunity - Gabriela as voted by Brazil to be immune in the fake eviction, Paula as the Head of Household during the fake eviction, and Rízia as week 8's Head of Household.

The Brazilian public voted to save two of the nominee with the other two nominees facing a house eviction vote. In the event of a tied eviction vote, the nominee with the lowest vote total from the public vote was evicted. Tereza and Hariany were the housemates who received the fewest public votes to save and Tereza was evicted by a house vote of 5–3.

Big Boss
The Big Boss was introduced during week 2 as an added interactive feature. During Thursday's live show, the public may vote to select between two options which may or may not influence directly in the game.

Power of No

Housemates
The cast list with 18 housemates was unveiled on January 9, 2019. 
On January 12, Fábio Alano, a 27-year-old P.E. teacher & MMA athlete from Porto Alegre, was kicked off of the show during the sequester period, after it was revealed he had a sponsorship contract with a fitness clothing brand and did not told the producers. After his removal from the game, no replacement was designated, bringing the number of housemates down to 17.(ages stated at time of contest)

Future appearances

After this season, in 2019, Hariany Almeida appeared in A Fazenda 11, she finished the season as Runner-Up.

After this season, in 2019, Hana Khalil appeared on De Férias com o Ex Brasil: Celebs as original cast member.

In 2020, Isabella Cecchi appeared on Big Brother Brasil 20 as a model in an activity.

In 2021, Carolina Peixinho and Elana Valenária appeared in No Limite 5. Carolina finished in 7th place, while Elana finished in 5th place.

Voting history
 Key
  – Chained  Red team
  – Chained  White team

Notes

Have and Have-Nots 
This season, each housemate receives a weekly sum of Estalecas (the house currency) to make the purchases in the Big Brother Brasil market. The items purchased are for the consumption of whole house, but a housemate can save them for their own consumption. A panel in the kitchen updates individual balances and the total house money. If there is an individual or collective punishment, the values are reduced; and if the loss is too big, all housemates (including the Head of Household) become Have-Nots for the week. In the panel is also possible to check the control of water consumption so both public and housemates can follow. Upon reaching the indicated limit, the house is punished with the water suspension.

Controversy 
The nineteenth season became highly controversial after a variety of racist, homophobic and misogynistic remarks were made by several of the housemates (including Diego Wantowsky, Gustavo Soares, Hariany Almeida, Maycon Santos and winner Paula von Sperling) on the live feeds but not aired on primetime episodes and alleged rigging from production and host Tiago Leifert fixing the game for certain players.

Maycon 
Maycon Santos became controversial on social media after casually telling a story about committing an act of animal cruelty, when he strapped firecrackers into a cat's tail and put tape on the animal so that it would walk in circles. The naturalness with which Maycon spoke about the act infuriated viewers and celebrities such as Tatá Werneck. Activist Luísa Mell even encouraged her followers to evict him from the house.

During a Saturday party, after watching Rodrigo França and Gabriela Hebling dance to the song "Identidade" by Jorge Aragão (a samba that exalts blackness), Maycon told Diego Wantowsky that he had felt a shiver when he heard that "weird music" and that "several voices were talking to me saying 'do not be like them'". The next day, he even insinuated that Gabriela had made a macumba (Afro-Brazilian-witchcraft) for Isabella Cecchi to become ill. Due these statements, Maycon was labeled by viewers as racist and accused of religious intolerance.

Paula 
Paula von Sperling, in a conversation with Elana Valenária and Gabriela Hebling, said she also had "bad hair" when she heard from Gabriela that Elana's hair was curly, in which Gabriela countered by saying that "Bad is prejudice".

During a chat with Diego Wantowsky and Hariany Almeida, Paula told them about a case of feminicide, where she thought the criminal was going to be a faveladão (man who lives in a favela, whose area's population consists of a 70% majority of self-identified Afro-Brazilians) but was surprised to discover that "he was a white man, who lived in Australia".

Paula once again, in another conversation with Hariany, admitted that she likes bullying people. Laughing, she said that "soon (the network) Globo will be sued for all the bullying we're doing on the show, oh my god, I'm terrible, but it's not bad, I think it's funny".

During another chat with Gabriela and Rodrigo França (both Afro-Brazilians), Paula suggested that "'dumb blonde' jokes can be equated with racism" and asked their opinions on racial quotas in college, claiming that such quotas are a form of discrimination. Finally, she shared her thoughts about the meaning of "black humor": "It's when you pick up a black person and start joking about her. That's black humor".

In a private conversation with Diego and Hariany, Paula threw a shade at her fellow housemates Gabriela, Hana Khalil and Rízia Cerqueira's political beliefs: "These feminists don't want to have a discussion, they just want to talk, thinking they're right in everything, we have to be very careful about what we say around them".

Paula also gave demonstrations of religious intolerance while commenting on Rodrigo's religious beliefs: "I'm very afraid of Rodrigo. He messes with these treks there...He talks all the time about this Oxum thing. I'm afraid of that. Our God is greater". As result, Decradi (Office of Racial and Intolerance Crimes) in Rio opened an investigation due Maycon Santos and Paula's statements.

Rede Globo has avoided showing most of Paula's bigoted remarks on the daily highlights show, left fans and media wondering if production is attempting to put out a clean image of her, thus favoring her game. The hashtag #BBBProtectsRacists went to the trending topics on Twitter on January 30.

On March 12, 2019, Paula began to be investigated by the police for prejudice based on religious intolerance but was summoned to testify only after she left the house. On April 5, 2019, three days after being evicted, Rodrigo decided to testified against Paula in the Racial Crimes and Intolerance Offices in Rio de Janeiro, accusing her of prejudice against the color of his skin and his religion of African origin.

On April 15, 2019, Paula testified to the police for over two hours and left the district in a car with dark glasses and covered face without talking to press. On April 18, the police concluded that there was prejudice against Rodrigo from Paula's part and, therefore, she will be indicted.

Rodrigo 
After being nominated for eviction by Head of Household Paula on week 11, Rodrigo França's official social media profiles suffered a series of racist attacks and death threats. As result, Rodrigo's family decided to file a lawsuit. According to lawyer Ricardo Brajterman, the offenses were made by fake and non-fake profiles and such criminal posts will be sent to the Computer Crime Repression Office and later sent to the Public Prosecutor's Office to penalize the criminals.

Vanderson 
As soon as the cast was unveiled, Vanderson Brito was accused of physical and psychological abuse by an ex-girlfriend, Maíra Menezes, through her social media account. The case would have occurred 10 years before the start of the season. Vanderson was intimated to testify at the Jacarepaguá Women's Police Station on January 23, 2019. As the rules do not allow anyone to leave the house temporarily, Vanderson was disqualified on the same day, and was not replaced.

Ratings and reception

Brazilian ratings
All numbers are in points and provided by Kantar Ibope Media.

 In 2019, each point represents 254.892 households in 15 market cities in Brazil (73.015 households in São Paulo).
 : This episode aired on a special time at 10:30 p.m.
 : This episode aired on a special time at 8:00 p.m.

References

External links
 Official site 

19
2019 Brazilian television seasons